The 2011 Indianapolis Enforcers season was the first season for the Continental Indoor Football League (CIFL) franchise.

The Enforcers came into existence when K.C. Carter, the owner of the Mid-States Football League's Indianapolis Stampede, put together an expansion franchise to compete in the CIFL. Having been involved with football, be it as a player, owner, head coach or league commissioner for over 35 years, Carter wanted to take on the challenge of the indoor football game. He put his team together in just 32 days, acquiring players with the understanding that there would be no pay this year. He did not want to be a team that promised the world and delivered nothing. This team was assembled by invitation only. He found his talent in his semi-pro team, The Stampede, and team USA. He also grabbed a few plays from Central State University, and a few players from the defunct Fort Wayne FireHawks.

Because they joined the CIFL so late, they had no lease to play games in a home arena. This caused the Enforcers to play on the road in 2011, with the hopes of finding a permanent home in 2012. Carter had aspirations that Conseco Field House or the Pepsi Coliseum would be the home for the Enforcers in 2012. On February 26, 2011, the Enforcers lost their first game in franchise history by a score of 69-12 to the Port Huron Predators. On March 19, 2011, the Enforcers gave up a Cincinnati Commandos record 8 touchdown passes to Tyler Sheehan. On April 2, 2011, the Enforcers again became a part of CIFL history, as they gave up a record, 8 rushing touchdowns in a single game, en route to a 78-0 defeat to the Marion Blue Racers. The Enforcers lone victory in its expansion season was a 2-0 forfeit win over the Predators as they failed to finish the season. They finished the season 1-9 and 6th overall.

Players

Signings

Final roster

Regular season

Regular season

Standings

Regular season

Week 1: vs Port Huron Predators

Week 2: vs Dayton Silverbacks
The Enforcers fell to the Silverbacks, 13-69. Melvin Bryant caught touchdowns of 27 and 37 yards from Jeremy Greenleaf. Fred Cromartie and Daniel Stover each chipped in with a touchdown catch.

Week 4: vs Cincinnati Commandos

Week 6: vs Marion Blue Racers

Week 7: vs Chicago Knights

Week 8: vs Chicago Knights

Week 10: vs Port Huron Predators

Week 11: vs Dayton Silverbacks

Week 12: vs Marion Blue Racers

Week 13: vs Cincinnati Commandos

Stats

Passing

Rushing

Receiving

Stats reference

See also 
 The Forum at Fishers
 2012 Indianapolis Enforcers season

References

2011 Continental Indoor Football League season
Indianapolis Enforcers
Indianapolis Enforcers